John Benedict "Peanuts" O'Flaherty (April 10, 1918 — July 16, 2008) was a Canadian professional ice hockey player who played 21 games in the National Hockey League with the New York Americans and Brooklyn Americans. He was born in Toronto, Ontario.

Playing career
Peanuts received his nickname when a Toronto sports writer spotted him selling peanuts at Maple Leaf Gardens in 1933. In 21 career NHL games O'Flaherty recorded 5 goals and an assist for 6 points. He played several seasons in the American Hockey League with the Pittsburgh Hornets in the 1940s. His son, Gerry O'Flaherty, would go on to play in the NHL from 1971 to 1979.

Career statistics

Regular season and playoffs

References

External links
 

1918 births
2008 deaths
Brooklyn Americans players
Canadian ice hockey left wingers
Canadian people of Irish descent
New York Americans players
Pittsburgh Hornets players
Ice hockey people from Toronto
Springfield Indians players
Toronto Marlboros players
Toronto St. Michael's Majors players